Saurus K (born Keith Hoskins) and Bones (born Brett Hoskins), better known as Saurus And Bones, are American rap artists from Naperville, Illinois.

Career
Saurus And Bones started rapping in the summer of 2001 and have spent the last 17 years perfecting their style. With the release of their first extended play, "Skeletal Thesaurus", Saurus And Bones became involved with the Chicago hip-hop scene, networking and performing at many shows.

Their style is based on hardcore intensity and original metaphoric lyrics saturated with multisyllabic rhyme patterns and tied together with a midwest influence. Recently, Saurus N Bones have been opening for AK at shows around Chicago and its suburbs. They have also opened for other big artists, including Kottonmouth Kings.

"Mind Like Mine"
Saurus And Bones gained attention in 2009 with their debut album, Mind Like Mine, including the single "Legendary" which featured Chicago hip hop artists Twista and AK of Do Or Die. The album also featured Stubhy Pandav of Lucky Boys Confusion, Young Zee of the Outsidaz, and Big Left formerly of La Coka Nostra.

Discography

Studio albums
 2009 - Mind Like Mine

Extended plays
 2006 - Skeletal Thesaurus

References

American hip hop groups
Midwest hip hop groups